Tim Tingle is a member of the Choctaw Nation of Oklahoma an author and storyteller of twenty books.

Early life 
Tingle was raised on the Gulf Coast outside of Houston, Texas. He is an Oklahoma Choctaw. His great-great grandfather, John Carnes, walked the Trail of Tears in 1835, and his paternal grandmother attended Native American boarding schools in the early 1900s. In order to preserve the legacy of the Choctaw culture, Tim's family shared stories of their heritage and the struggles that Native Americans face.

Education 
Tingle received a bachelor's degree in English from the University of Texas, and he received his master's degree in English Literature (with a focus in Native American Studies) from the University of Oklahoma in 2003.

Career 
Tingle is a featured storyteller at festivals across the nation, after getting his start telling stories when he visited the school his son attended. He frequently performs at the Texas Storytelling Festival, most recently in March, 2018. In 2002, he was featured at the National Storytelling Festival. In June 2011, Tim spoke at the Library of Congress. In 2014, Tim was featured author and speaker at the National Book Festival in Washington, D.C. Tingle has also travelled to Germany to complete over ten speaking tours on behalf of the US Department of Defense, teaching children and military personnel about his experience as a Choctaw Native American. Tingle was a speaker at the Native American wing of the Smithsonian Institution in 2006 and 2007.

Tingle's first book, Walking the Choctaw Road, was recognized by Storytelling World Magazine as the Best Anthology of 2003. He has won awards for many of his other books for youth. Flying Lessons, the anthology of stories edited by Ellen Oh for the "We Need Diverse Books" movement includes a piece by Tingle.

Selected works

Anthologies and short stories
 Walking the Choctaw Road (Cinco Puntos Press, 2003) 
 Texas Ghost Stories (Texas Tech University Press, 2004) 
 Spooky Texas Tales (Texas Tech University Press, 2005) 
 Spirits Dark and Light: Supernatural Tales from the Five Civilized Tribes (August House Publishers, 2006) 
 More Spooky Texas Tales (Texas Tech University Press, 2010) 
 Flying Lessons and Other Stories (Crown Books for Young Readers, 2017)

Standalone stories
 Crossing Bok Chitto: A Choctaw Tale of Friendship and Freedom (Cinco Puntos Press, 2008) 
 Saltypie (Cinco Puntos Press, 2010) 
 When Turtle Grew Feathers (August House Publishers, 2013) 
 House of Purple Cedar (Cinco Puntos Press, 2014) 
 How I Became a Ghost (Roadrunner Press, 2015) 
 When a Ghost Talks, Listen (Roadrunner Press, 2018) 
 Stone River Crossing (Tu Books, 2019)

Blackgoat series
 Danny Blackgoat, Navajo Prisoner (7th Generation Publishers, 2013) 
 Danny Blackgoat, Rugged Road to Freedom (7th Generation Publishers, 2014)

No Name series
 No Name (7th Generation, 2014) 
 No More No Name (7th Generation, 2017) 
 A Name Earned (7th Generation, 2018) 
 Trust Your Name (7th Generation, 2018) 
 Name Your Mountain (7th Generation, 2020)

Honors and awards 
 2018 Arrell Gibson Lifetime Achievement Award
 Spirits Dark and Light: Supernatural Tales from the Five Civilized Tribes — 2006 IndieFab Award, Popular Culture (third place)
 Crossing Bok Chitto: A Choctaw Tale of Friendship and Freedom — 2007 American Library Association - Notable Children's Book (winner)
 How I Became a Ghost — 2013 American Indian Youth Literature Award - Middle School (winner); 2014 American Indian Youth Literature Award - Middle School (winner)
 House of Purple Cedar — 2016 American Indian Youth Literature Award - Young Adult (winner)
 Danny Blackgoat, Navajo Prisoner — 2013 American Indian Youth Literature Award - Middle School (Honor Book); 2014 American Indian Youth Literature Award - Middle School (Honor Book); 2014 Independent Publisher Book Award - Multicultural Fiction Young Adult (bronze medal winner)

References

External links 
 Tim Tingle Website

Living people
Native American writers
Year of birth missing (living people)
Place of birth missing (living people)
American male writers
21st-century American writers
Choctaw Nation of Oklahoma people
21st-century Native Americans